Nandus nandus, commonly known as the Gangetic leaffish, is a species of Asian leaffish native to South Asia and Indochina. They are common in slow-moving or stagnant bodies of water, including ponds, lakes, ditches, and flooded fields. Other common names of the species include mottled nandus and mud perch. They are commercially important and are highly prized as food fish. They are also caught for the aquarium trade.

References

Fish described in 1822
Nandidae